The men's 400 metres event at the 2019 European Athletics U23 Championships was held in Gävle, Sweden, at Gavlehof Stadium Park on 11, 12, and 13 July.

Medalists

Records
Prior to the competition, the records were as follows:

Results

Heats
Qualification rule: First 3 (Q) and the next 4 fastest (q) qualified for the semifinals.

Semifinals
Qualification: First 3 in each heat (Q) and next 2 fastest (q) qualified for the final.

Final

References

400 metres
400 metres at the European Athletics U23 Championships